Proxy Networks, Inc. is a provider of Remote Desktop Software and remote collaboration software designed for help desk technicians, network administrators, and IT managers. Proxy Networks software has been used by US government agencies, multinational corporations, and is distributed worldwide by vendors; the company’s remote access, remote control, and remote management tools are especially geared towards SMBs and enterprises in the legal, healthcare, education, government, financial services, and professional services sectors. Proxy Networks produces the Proxy Pro software series, which consists of four editions. The company was formed in 2006 by a venture capital-backed acquisition from Juniper Networks. Headquartered in Boston, Massachusetts, Proxy Networks is led by chief executive officer Andy Kim.

Software Editions
As of 11/16/2022, the latest version is v10.5 Hotfix #2.  The PROXY Pro remote control software series is composed of two on-premise solutions while the third is hosted: 
 PROXY Pro P2P Edition provides remote desktop access directly from one computer to another in peer-to-peer fashion.  It consists of the PROXY Pro Master (viewer) and the PROXY Pro Host (client) and the PROXY Pro Deployment Tool.
 PROXY Pro RAS Edition (Remote Access Server) utilizes the same PROXY Pro Master and PROXY Pro Host components and adds the Web Console, a server-side component that allows for the access, management and remote control of Host machines from a browser.  It is an on-premises remote desktop software solution for remote support and collaboration with configurable service management tools, screen recording, real-time reporting and historical connection reporting.
 PROXY Air  is a hosted remote desktop service eliminating the need for a customer to manage a server on premise.

Company history
Proxy Networks’ technology was originally developed by Funk Software, which introduced the first remote desktop support software for the Windows 3.1 platform circa 1993.

In late 2005, Funk Software was taken over by Juniper Networks.

In July 2006, with financial backing from de Anda Capital LLC (a private equity firm with investments in companies such as Asurion and ServiceSource), newly incorporated Proxy Networks Inc. acquired the remote desktop software product line from Juniper Networks  for an undisclosed amount.

At this time the Proxy Networks team consisted of ten employees, and was headed by chief executive officer Andy Kim.  According to Kim, at the time of the acquisition, the proprietary software (later renamed “Proxy Pro”) was already installed at hundreds of companies such as Boeing Co., Fidelity Investments and the U.S. Secret Service.

Regarding the acquisition, Juniper VP Joe Ryan commented that the remote desktop software was “not in Juniper’s area of focus,” and that Juniper would concentrate more on network security than management of computers and servers.

Product Distribution
Proxy Networks' products are sold directly to customers in North America. They are sold through third-party vendors in Europe, Asia, Africa, the Middle East, South America, and Latin America.

Version history

Clients
The following companies and organizations are among those that have used PROXY Pro remote desktop software.       
 Boeing Co.     
 Fidelity Investments      
 U.S. Secret Service     
 Kisco Senior Living        
 U.S. Department of the Interior        
 Hitachi
 Toyoda Gosei
 Colorado Rockies

References

Remote desktop
Remote administration software